Flight 56 may refer to:

Bristow Helicopters Flight 56C, crashed on 19 January 1995
Azerbaijan Airlines Flight 56, crashed on 5 December 1995

0056